"We Ride (I See the Future)" is a song by American singer Mary J. Blige. It was written by Blige, Johnta Austin,
Bryan-Michael Cox, and Kendrick "WyldCard" Dean for her first greatest hits album, Reflections (A Retrospective) (2006), while production was helmed by Cox, with Dean credit as co-producer. It was released  to US radio as the album's lead in the first week of November 2006. Upon its release, it became a top ten hit in Italy and reached the top 20 on the US Billboard Hot R&B/Hip-Hop Songs chart.

Background
"We Ride" was produced by Bryan Michael Cox, with Kendrick "WyldCard" Dean co-producing. The premise of the song is a celebration of her newfound happiness with then-husband and manager, Kendu Isaacs. The song contains the lyrics "from the day to the night we ride, I see the future, baby, you and I, better with time." Cox stated "Mary's married, she's happy, in the best shape of her life, her voice is in the best shape of her life [...] people thought she was over, done, then she came through with The Breakthrough – "We Ride" celebrates all of that."

Music video
An accompanying music video for "We Ride" was shot in New York City in early November and directed by Erik White.  The video opens up similar to Blige's music video for "Be Without You," except it overlooks Los Angeles. Blige is singing in black with a black background then goes to her riding a blue bike. Another bike which is red and black appears which is her then-huband, Kendu Isaacs. The two ride to the beach. From there it switches from Blige singing in a fur vest to Blige singing in a white dress in front of an orchestra, both on rocks on the beach, to the end of the video. It premiered on December 9, 2006 on the MTV network.

Track listings

Notes
 denotes a co-producer
 denotes a remix producer

Credits and personnel 
Credits adapted from the Reflections (A Retrospective) liner notes.

Johnta Austin – writer
Mary J. Blige – vocal arranger, writer
Bryan-Michael Cox – producer, writer
Kendrick "WyldCard" Dean – co-producer, writer
Ron Fair – vocal arranger
Tal Herzog – additional pro tools
Kandu Isaacs – vocal recording
Dave Pensado – mixing
Sam Thomas– vocal tracking

Charts

Weekly charts

Year-end charts

References

2006 singles
Mary J. Blige songs
Songs written by Johntá Austin
Songs written by Mary J. Blige
Songs written by Bryan-Michael Cox
Music videos directed by Erik White
2006 songs
Geffen Records singles
Songs written by Kendrick Dean